Lisa Hopkins is a Democratic American politician from West Virginia. She served as the interim West Virginia State Auditor during 2016 after she was appointed to the seat by Earl Ray Tomblin following the resignation of Glen Gainer. Hopkins started working in the office of the West Virginia auditor in 1999. In 2001, she became the general counsel of the office and the deputy commissioner of securities. She remained in these positions until being appointed interim auditor. The filing deadlines already passed at the time Hopkins was appointed on May 15, 2016, making her ineligible to run for election to a full term in 2016. Republican JB McCuskey won the 2016 election as auditor, becoming the first Republican auditor of West Virginia since 1976. She received her B.A. from Barnard College and her J.D. from the Boston University School of Law.

As of 2020, she serves as president of the North American Securities Administrators Association.

References 

West Virginia Democrats
State auditors of West Virginia
Women in West Virginia politics
Barnard College alumni
Boston University School of Law alumni
Living people
Year of birth missing (living people)